This is a list of internal combustion engines produced by the former Allis-Chalmers Corporation Engine Division for use in their lines of tractors, combine harvesters, other agricultural equipment, engine-generators, and other industrial plant.

Allis-Chalmers purchased the Buda Engine Co. in 1953 and took over their well-established line of products. Since Buda was merged entirely into A-C as part of their new Engine Division, its operations became known simply as the "Harvey plant" and all of its production after 1953 was under the Allis-Chalmers name.

The very earliest A-C tractors, up to the mid-1930s, used engines built by outside suppliers (LeRoi, Midwest, Waukesha and Continental were common). Those engines are not included in this list. In a later reversal of this practice, the Engine Division eventually served as a third-party supplier to other makers of farm and industrial machinery, most notably Cockshutt and LeRoi.

Allis-Chalmers (and Buda) produced heavy-duty engine designs that were built to handle a variety of fuel types (generally gasoline, diesel fuel, or liquefied propane gas). The types of fuel each engine could burn are listed where appropriate; further information on fuel types for each engine can be found in the individual engine articles.

Inline four-cylinder

153 Series (153in3; gasoline or diesel)
175 Series (175in3; diesel)
182 Series (182in3; gasoline or diesel)
344 Series (344in3; diesel)
433 Series (200in3; gasoline or diesel)
B Series (116 or 125in3; gasoline)
E Series (460, 510, or 563in3; gasoline or diesel)
G Series (138, 149, or 160in3; gasoline or propane)
W Series (201 or 226in3; gasoline or propane)

Inline six-cylinder

230 Series (230in3; gasoline or diesel)
262 Series (262in3; gasoline, propane or diesel)
273 Series (273in3; gasoline or diesel)
649 Series (301in3; gasoline, propane or diesel)
670 Series (426in3; diesel)
685 Series (516in3; diesel)
6120 Series (731in3; diesel)
6138 Series (844in3; gasoline or diesel)

V8 cylinder

V8 Series (1358in3; diesel)

V12 cylinder

V12 Series (2035in3; diesel)

See also

Allis-Chalmers
Gleaner -- A-C's line of combine harvesters, purchased in 1955
List of Allis-Chalmers tractors
Buda Engine Co.

References
Swinford, Norm (1994). Allis-Chalmers Farm Equipment 1914-1985. 

List engines
Lists of automobile engines